Najafabad (also Romanized as Najafābād; also known as Qalā Cheqā, Qal‘eh Chakeh, Qal‘eh Chankeh, and Qal‘eh-ye Chakeh) is a village in Jolgeh Rural District, in the Central District of Asadabad County, Hamadan Province, Iran. At the 2006 census, its population was 142, in 29 families.

References 

Populated places in Asadabad County